The men's 1500 metres at the 2017 World Championships in Athletics was held at the London Olympic Stadium on 10, 11, and 13 August.

Summary

From the gun in the final, the Kenyan team took charge as Elijah Manangoi from the inside and Timothy Cheruiyot from the outside squeezed the pack behind their wall. The third Kenyan, Asbel Kiprop went to his typical position marking the back of the pack. After a moderate lap, controlling the pace, Kiprop moved forward and the two leaders accelerated to a quick five metre breakaway. In the next half lap, that break expanded to 10 metres with only Kiprop able to bridge the gap. Through the next half lap, three men, led by Filip Ingebrigtsen (NOR), followed by Adel Mechaal (ESP) and Sadik Mikhou (BHR) were able to bridge the gap, with Ingebrigtsen able to reach the trailing Kiprop on the inside at the bell. Ingebrigtsen was able to hold the inside, making Kiprop run to the outside through the penultimate turn. Down the backstretch Mechaal was also able to pass Kiprop, who was struggling. The sweep was broken but Cheruiyot and Manangoi were still in front, Cheruiyot holding the leading inside position. Coming off the turn, Manangoi displayed some of his reputed 46 second (400) speed, running past his teammate and on to a 2-metre victory. Three metres behind, Mechaal made a serious move to try to get ahead of Ingebrigtsen, trying to pass in the narrow space on the inside. He got his shoulders as far as Ingebrigtsen's 10 metres prior to the finish but couldn't get by, both men struggling and falling toward the finish line. Ingebrigtsen leaned for the bronze medal position while Mechaal put his hand out onto Ingebrigtsen's back. Ingebrigtsen fell into a sideways somersault after the finish, both finishing just ahead of a fast closing Jakub Holuša (CZE).

Records
Before the competition records were as follows:

The following records were set at the competition:

Qualification standard
The standard to qualify automatically for entry was 3:36.00.

Schedule
The event schedule, in local time (UTC+1), is as follows:

Results

Heats
The first round took place on 10 August in three heats as follows:

The first six in each heat ( Q ) and the next six fastest ( q ) qualified for the semifinals. The overall results were as follows:

Semifinals
The semifinals took place on 11 August in two heats as follows:

The first five in each heat ( Q ) and the next two fastest ( q ) qualified for the final. The overall results were as follows:

Final
The final took place on 13 August at 20:30. The results were as follows (photo finish):

References

1500
1500 metres at the World Athletics Championships